Tùng Dương (birth name Nguyễn Tùng Dương, born September 18, 1983) is a Vietnamese singer. He came to fame after the 2004 music contest Sao Mai điểm hẹn, in which he won first place as ranked by the judges. Songs he performed in the contest, most of which are contemporary folk songs written by Lê Minh Sơn, were included in his first studio album called Chạy trốn (2004). After ceasing from performing Lê Minh Sơn's compositions, Tùng Dương started to sing songs by other songwriters such as Ngọc Đại, Như Huy, Giáng Son, Lưu Hà An, and performed in two music shows, Vọng Nguyệt by songwriter Quốc Trung and Gió bình minh by songwriter Đỗ Bảo.

Biography

Early life and childhood 
Tùng Dương was born on September 18, 1983, in Hà Nội. His father's homeland is Quảng Trị. He is the eldest child in his family. His father is a businessman, his mother was once the owner of a make-up and photo shop – later she became the costume designer for Tùng Dương. While his parents were not singers, Dương had been exposed to music early in life, especially under the influence of his grandfather, songwriter Trần Hoàn. Other than that, poet Phạm Hổ and songwriter Phạm Thế Mỹ were his grandmother's younger brothers. When Tùng Dương was in grade three, his parents went to Russia for business, and Dương was brought up by his uncles. In Russia, his parents often sent him new CDs. He had been exposed to jazz since he was very young, which helped shape his musical style later on.

In 1995, Tùng Dương received his first award, a silver medal at the 1995 Vietnam National Radio and Television Broadcast Talented Vocalist (Huy chương bạc Giọng hát hay Phát thanh Truyền hình Toàn quốc). Soon after that, when he was 12, Dương was delegated as the youngest member of Vietnam Singing and Dancing Team (Đoàn Ca múa nhạc Việt Nam) to perform in Moscow.

In 1999, Tùng Dương passed the entrance test of Hanoi Conservatory of Music (currently the Vietnam National Academy of Music), and studied under the guidance of Quang Thọ. Tùng Dương continued to win numerous awards, namely the third prize of Hanoi Music Contest for Young Singers in 1999, third prize and first prize of Hanoi Music Contest for Talented Singers in 2001 and 2003, respectively. He earned his Bachelor of Arts from the Academy in 2007.

References 

1983 births
Living people
21st-century Vietnamese male singers